Michael Boder (born 9 November 1958) is a German conductor of opera and concert who works internationally. The chief conductor of the Royal Danish Theatre, he has conducted regularly at the Vienna State Opera, including the premieres of Cerha's Der Riese vom Steinfeld and Reimann's Medea. He also conducted the premieres of operas by Dusapin, Enescu, Henze, Lombardi, Penderecki and Trojahn.

Career 

Born in Darmstadt, Boder studied first at the Musikhochschule Hamburg, then in Florence where he worked with Riccardo Muti and Zubin Mehta. He  was an assistant to Michael Gielen at the Frankfurt Opera. He became chief conductor of the Basel Opera at age 29, working as a guest already at this time in Hamburg, Cologne, Munich, Berlin and at Covent Garden in London.

In 1991, he conducted in Basel the premiere of Luca Lombardi's Faust. Un travestimento. He became a regular guest conductor at the state operas of Berlin, Dresden, Hamburg and Munich. He also conducted at the San Francisco Opera, the Deutsche Oper Berlin and the Zürich Opera. He is focused on contemporary music, in opera and also in concert.

Boder made his debut at the Vienna State Opera on 15 December 1995, conducting Alban Berg's  Wozzeck. He conducted there also Elektra, 
Die Frau ohne Schatten and Ariadne auf Naxos, all by Richard Strauss, Schönberg's Die Jakobsleiter, Puccini's Gianni Schicchi, Berg's Lulu, Wagner's Die Meistersinger von Nürnberg, Hindemith's Cardillac, and the premieres of Friedrich Cerha's Der Riese vom Steinfeld in 2002 and Aribert Reimann's Medea in 2010.

He made his debut at the Royal Opera House conducting Verdi's Rigoletto. He conducted there the premiere of Morgen und Abend by Georg Friedrich Haas. Other operatic premiere were in 1991 Penderecki's Ubu Rex for the opening of the Munich Opera Festival, in 1992 Reimann's Das Schloß, in 1998 Manfred Trojahn's Was ihr wollt at the Bavarian State Opera, and in 2007 Henze's Phaedra at the Berlin Staatsoper Unter den Linden. In 1996, he conducted the German premiere of Enescu's Œdipe in a production shown at several houses. He conducted the premiere of Pascal Dusapin's Faustus, the Last Night at the Staatsoper Berlin.

He was the General Music Director (GMD) of the Liceu in Barcelona from 2008 to 2012, and has been chief conductor of the Royal Danish Theatre from the 2012/13 season.

References

External links 
 
 Michael Boder Liceu Barcelona
 

German male conductors (music)
1958 births
Living people
Musicians from Darmstadt
Hochschule für Musik und Theater Hamburg alumni
21st-century German conductors (music)
21st-century German male musicians